The Ginger Rogers filmography lists the film appearances of American actress Ginger Rogers, as well as her television, stage, and radio credits. Rogers's career spanned fifty-seven years, from 1930 to 1987.

Initially signing with Paramount Pictures in 1930, she quickly opted out of her contract and worked for several studios, most notably for Warner Brothers in musicals 42nd Street (1933) and Gold Diggers of 1933 (1933), during this time she was named one of WAMPAS Baby Stars. In 1932 Ginger co-starred with comedian Joe E. Brown in the movie, "You Said A Mouthful". In 1933, Rogers signed with RKO Radio Pictures, where she was paired with dancer Fred Astaire in commercially successful Flying Down to Rio (1933). The pair achieved  greater success in subsequent musicals The Gay Divorcee (1934), Top Hat (1935), Swing Time (1936), and Shall We Dance (1937), totaling 8 films made between 1933 and 1939.

Without Astaire, Rogers starred in critically and commercially successful non-musicals throughout the remainder of the 1930s such as Stage Door (1937) with Katharine Hepburn, Vivacious Lady (1938) with James Stewart, and Bachelor Mother  (1939) with David Niven, culminating with an Academy Award for Best Actress for her performance in Kitty Foyle (1940).

Rogers flourished throughout the 1940s, becoming one of the most popular and highest paid actresses of the decade. She starred in comedies Tom, Dick and Harry (1941) and Roxie Hart (1942; this was an adaptation of the 1926 non-musical play Chicago, and later the inspiration for the hit 1975 musical and 2002 film adaptation), dramas Tender Comrade (1943) and I'll Be Seeing You (1944) and in director Billy Wilder's American film debut The Major and the Minor (1942).

She was reunited with Fred Astaire for MGM's The Barkleys of Broadway (1949).

In the 1950s, Rogers' film career had faltered, due to lesser demand for older actresses. She co-starred with popular Cary Grant in Monkey Business (1952) but her career continued to wane throughout the decade. She ended her film career with one of two fictionalized biographies on actress Jean Harlow in 1965's Harlow. Beginning the following year, she found success by returning to musical theatre, including a stint as one of several replacements for Carol Channing in the long-running Hello, Dolly! on Broadway.

Films

Box office ranking

1935 - 14th
1936 - 19th
1938 - 18th
1939 - 21st
1940 - 23rd
1941 - 18th
1944 - 16th
1945 - 23rd

Short subjects
File:Perry Como Ginger Rogers 1957.JPG| An appearance with Perry Como on TV's Kraft Music Hall (1957)
 A Day of a Man of Affairs (1929)
 A Night in a Dormitory (1930)
 Campus Sweethearts (1930)
 Office Blues (1930)
 Hollywood on Parade (1932)
 Screen Snapshots (1932)
 Hollywood on Parade No. A-9 (1933)
 Hollywood Newsreel (1934)
 Screen Snapshots Series 16, No. 3 (1936)
 Show Business at War (1943)
 Battle Stations (Narrator, 1944)
 Screen Snapshots: The Great Showman (1950)
 Screen Snapshots: Hollywood's Great Entertainers (1954)

Television

 Perry Como's Kraft Music Hall, at least 10 appearances between 1956 and 1965
 The DuPont Show with June Allyson, as Kay Neilson in "The Tender Shoot" (October 18, 1959)
 What's My Line? (at least six appearances between 1954 and 1966)
 The Hollywood Palace (two appearances, 1964)
 The Red Skelton Show (at least 3 episodes, 1963–64)
 The Jack Benny Program (1957)
 The Pat Boone Chevy Showroom (1959)
 The Ed Sullivan Show (1963), singing "Something's Gotta Give"
 Rodgers & Hammerstein's Cinderella (1965 remake starring Lesley Ann Warren)
 Here's Lucy, episode "Ginger Rogers Comes to Tea" (1971)
 The Love Boat (1979) (episodes 3.10 and 3.11) as Stella (costar in episode: Douglas Fairbanks, Jr.)
 Glitter (1984) (episode 1.3)
 Hotel (1987) (episode 5.1) (final screen role)

Stage work

 Top Speed (1929)
 Girl Crazy (1930)
 Love and Let Love (1951)
 The Pink Jungle (1959)
 Annie Get Your Gun (1960)
 Bell, Book and Candle (1960)
 Calamity Jane (1961)
 Husband and Wife (1962)
 The Unsinkable Molly Brown (1963)
 A More Perfect Union (1963)
 Tovarich (1964)
 Hello, Dolly! (1965, Broadway,replacement for lead)
 Mame (London, 1969)
 Coco (1971)
 No, No, Nanette (1974)
 Forty Carats (1974)
 Anything Goes (1980)
 Miss Moffat (1983)
 Charley's Aunt (1984)

Radio appearances

References

External links

Actress filmographies
American filmographies